Herman Koene van Dijk (born 1946) is a Dutch economist Consultant at the Research Department of Norges Bank and Professor Emeritus at the Econometric Institute of the Erasmus University Rotterdam, known for his contributions in the field of Bayesian analysis.

Biography 
Van Dijk received his BA in Economics in 1967 and his Doctorandus degree in Economics in 1969 both at the University of Groningen. He went to the States, where he received his MA in Economics in 1972 from the State University of New York at Buffalo. Back in The Netherlands he received his PhD in Econometrics in 1984 from the Erasmus University Rotterdam under the supervision of Teun Kloek for the thesis "Posterior analysis of econometric models using Monte Carlo integration."

After graduation Van Dijk started his academic career as Assistant Professor at the Econometric Institute at the Erasmus University Rotterdam, were in 1994 he is appointed Professor of Econometrics at the Econometric Institute. From 1992 to 1998 he was first Director of the Tinbergen Institute, and later from 2008 to 2010. From 1998 to 2003 he was Director of the Econometric Institute as successor of Ton Vorst, and succeeded by Philip Hans Franses.

Van Dijk has been Visiting Professor at Cambridge University, the Catholic University of Louvain, Harvard University, Duke University, Cornell University, and the University of New South Wales. He has been referent, editor and on the editorial board of journals and other publications in the field of econometrics. And he has chaired and co-chaired  many conferences in the field.

In 1984 Van Dijk was awarded for his PhD dissertation The Savage Award by the International Society for Bayesian Analysis. He has been listed among the top ten European econometricians and is elected Fellow at the International Society of Bayesian Analysis; Fellow at the Rimini Center for Economic Analysis; Fellow of Journal of Econometrics in 2001, and Honorary Fellow of the Tinbergen Institute in 2005.

Work 
Van Dijk's research interests are in the field of "Bayesian inference using simulation techniques, time series econometrics, neural networks, and income distributions."

Posterior analysis of econometric models using Monte Carlo integration, 1984 
The 1984 "Posterior analysis of econometric models using Monte Carlo integration," was written as doctoral dissertation at the Erasmus University Rotterdam. In this work Van Dijk discussed "the use of Monte Carlo integration methods for the computation of the multivariate integrals that are defined in the posterior moments and densities of the parameters of interest of econometric models."

Econometric methods with applications in business and economics, 2004 
In "Econometric methods with applications in business and economics" (2004) Christiaan Heij et al. stated, that "nowadays applied work in business and economics requires a solid understanding of econometric methods to support decision-making."

This textbook takes a learning by doing approach, and "covers basic econometric methods (statistics, simple and multiple regression, nonlinear regression, maximum likelihood, and generalized method of moments), and addresses the creative process of model building with due attention to diagnostic testing and model improvement. Its last part is devoted to two major application areas: the econometrics of choice data (logit and probit, multinomial and ordered choice, truncated and censored data, and duration data) and the econometrics of time series data (univariate time series, trends, volatility, vector autoregressions, and a brief discussion of SUR models, panel data, and simultaneous equations)."

Publications 
Van Dijk has authored and co-authored over 180 papers, reports and books. Books, a selection:
 Van Dijk, H. K. Posterior analysis of econometric models using Monte Carlo integration. Doctoral dissertation. Rotterdam : Erasmus Universiteit, 1984.
 Heij, C., De Boer, P.,  Franses, P. H., Kloek, T., & Van Dijk, H. K. (2004). Econometric methods with applications in business and economics. Oxford University Press.

Articles, a selection:
 Kloek, Teun, and Herman K. Van Dijk. "Bayesian estimates of equation system parameters: an application of integration by Monte Carlo." Econometrica: Journal of the Econometric Society (1978): 1-19.
 Schotman, Peter C., and Herman K. Van Dijk. "On Bayesian routes to unit roots." Journal of Applied Econometrics 6.4 (1991): 387–401.
 Kleibergen, Frank, and Herman K. Van Dijk. "On the shape of the likelihood/posterior in cointegration models." Econometric Theory 10 (1994): 514-514.
 Paap, Richard, and Herman K. Van Dijk. "Distribution and mobility of wealth of nations." European Economic Review 42.7 (1998): 1269–1293.

References

External links 
 Herman K. van Dijk

1947 births
Living people
Dutch economists
Econometricians
University of Groningen alumni
University at Buffalo alumni
Erasmus University Rotterdam alumni
Academic staff of Erasmus University Rotterdam
Academic staff of Vrije Universiteit Amsterdam
People from Groningen (city)